The Depot River is a tributary of the Big Black River (Saint John River), flowing in the townships T12 R17 Wels, T13 R16 Wels and T14 R15 Wels, in the Aroostook County in North Maine Woods in Maine, in United States.

Its course runs entirely through forested region in an isolated mountain valley.

The watershed of the Depot River is accessible by some forest roads of Maine.

Geography 

The source of the Depot River begins at the mouth of Little Lake Presley, in townships T12 R17 WELS, in North Maine Woods, in Maine.

This source is located at:
  southeast of the border between Quebec and Maine;
  southwest of Mount Depot (Depot Mountain);
  Ssuthwest of the confluence of the Depot River;
  east of the Frontier Lake (Quebec-Maine) in Quebec.

Upper courses of Depot River (segment of )

  to the northeast in the Maine, up to the southwest bank of Mud Pond;
  to the northeast, crossing the Mud Pond over its full length to the mouth;
  to the northeast by cutting a forest road and across a marsh area in the second half of the segment, up to the confluence of a stream (from the southwest) ;
  to the north through a narrow marsh area up to a stream (from the northwest which drains a large marsh area, with dozens of small lakes);
  eastward up to the discharge (from the south) of a series of lakes;
  to the northeast up to the west shore of Lake Depot;
  northwards crossing the Lake Depot to the mouth.
Note: Lake Depot gets its water from the top of the Depot River and a stream (from the south) which is the discharge of a series of lakes and Mary L Pond.

Lower courses of Depot River (segment of )

  to the northwest up to Glazier Brook;
  (or  direct line) to the northeast, winding up Brown Brook (from the northwest or the Quebec where it is designated Brown River);
  (or  direct line) to the north, winding end segment until Dead Brook (from the northwest);
  to the northeast, up to a stream (from the northwest or the Quebec);
  to the east, skirting the northern Mont Depot up to Cunliffe Stream (from the south);
  to the southeast, up to a stream (from the south);
  to the northeast, up to a bridge of a forest road;
  north, up to a stream (from the west);
  to the southeast, winding end segment, up to the confluence of the river.

This confluence is located:
  at the southeast of the Canada-US border;
  at the southwest of the confluence of the Big Black River (Saint John River).

The Depot River pours on the south bank of the Big Black River (Saint John River) in the township T14 R15 Wels, in the Aroostook County. The latter flows northeast zigzagging up to a river bend of Saint John River where it pours on the west bank. The latest flows to the east, then southeast through all the New Brunswick and pours on the north bank of the Bay of Fundy which opens to the southwest on the Atlantic Ocean.

Toponymy 

The term "Depot" is associated with the Depot River in Lake Depot and Mont Depot.

See also 

 Aroostook County, a county Maine
 Brown River, a stream
 Big Black River (Saint John River), a stream
 Saint John River (Bay of Fundy), a stream
 North Maine Woods, a geographical region of Maine
 List of rivers of Maine

References

Bibliography

External links 
  Maine Streamflow USGS data
  Maine Watershed data from the Environmental Protection Agency

Rivers of Chaudière-Appalaches
Tributaries of the Saint John River (Bay of Fundy)
Rivers of Aroostook County, Maine
North Maine Woods
International rivers of North America